Bhumij is a Munda ethnic group of India. They primarily live in the Indian states of West Bengal, Odisha, and Jharkhand, mostly in the old Singhbhum district. Also in states like Bihar and Assam. There is also a sizeable population found in Bangladesh. Bhumijas speak the Bhumij language, an Austroasiatic language, and use Ol Onal script for writing.

Overview

Etymology 
Bhumij means "one who is born from the soil" and it is derived from word bhūmi (a land or soil). According to N. Ramaswani, the word is etymologically Bhūm-jo meaning "people originating from Bhum areas, i.e. Singhbhum, Dhalbhum, Manbhum, Barabhum, etc.", Dalton also had claimed that Bhumijs were the original inhabitants of Dhalbhum, Barabhum, Patkum and Baghmundi.

Social structure 
Social structure of the Bhumijs is characterised by nuclear family, patriliny, exogamy and hereditary headship of the village community. They follow Hindu practices of succession and inheritance. The Bhumijs are divided into several geographical endogamous groups based on ancestral territory and occupation, such as Tamaliya,  Na–gadi, Astha, Choto Astha in Jharkhand; Bara Bhuiya,  Deshua, Haldi Pukhria, Tamadi Sikharia, Tharua in Odisha;  Borabhui, Mura, Mura bhumij, Chaibasa mura,  Khanga mura, Kumpat mura, Manki bhumij in Assam; Bara, Bhoogol, Bhuiya,  Kada kata, Manki, Nag, Patkumia, Sing in Tripura. In Mayurbhanj, segmentary Bhumija group are Tamaria Bhumij (distinct from Tamudia, a Schedule Caste of Odisha), Haldipukuria Bhumij, Teli Bhumij, Desi or Dehuri Bhumij, Bada Bhumiyas and Kol Bhumij. In Purulia Tamaria Bhumij, Sikharbhumi Bhumij. Which are generally indicated their ancestral territory and profession. Each group forms an exogamous group of its own and do not intermarry. Each one of these groups consists of a number of exogamous sub-groups called "kili", the names of which are chosen from diverse sources representing fauna and flora, heavenly bodies, earth, etc. A Bhumij refrains from injuring anything represented by the name of the group. But there are no elaborate rituals in honour of clan totems. It may be that the exogamous groups were totemic, but with the progress of time and contact with their Hindu neighbours, the totemic system has turned into prohibitive marriage rules. Besides, lately they have developed a local grouping called the thaks, named after villages. Each of these thaks is also exogamous in the sense that a member of one thak cannot marry a member of the same village even if he or she belongs to a different sept. The rule of exogamy is so strict that a man may not marry a woman of his own sept, nor a woman who comes within the standard formula for reckoning prohibited degrees, calculated to three generations in the descending line, but sometimes extended to five where bhaiyadi or mutual recognition of kinship has been maintained between the families.

Geographic distribution 
The Bhumijs are found in Jharkhand, West Bengal, Odisha, Assam, and Bihar. They are concentrated in the districts of Midnapore, Purulia, Bankura and 24 Parganas in West Bengal. In Odisha, they are thickly concentrated in the districts of Mayurbhanj, Sundargarh, Keonjhar, and Balasore, and sporadically distributed in other parts. In Assam, where they are very recent immigrants, their greatest concentration occurs in the Assam valley. In Jharkhand, they are found in the districts of Singhbhum, Manbhum, Hazaribagh, Ranchi and Dhanbad. Bhumijs are also found sporadically in Chhattisgarh, Tripura, Arunachal Pradesh, Andaman and Nicobar, Meghalaya, Manipur, Delhi, Maharashtra, Andhra Pradesh and Madhya Pradesh. However, the Government of India classified only the Bhumijs of Odisha, Jharkhand and West Bengal state in the Scheduled Tribes list.

In Bangladesh, the Bhumij people came to the Sylhet region from Bihar as tea-labourers. They can be found in Srimangal with a population of 3000. The Bhumijs lives in Sylhet, Rajshahi, Khulna, Srimangal, Dhaka and Chittagong regions. They are divided into many clans (killi) such as Kaitra, Garur, Kasim, Bhugal, Baundra, Ban, Nag, Shona, Shar, Tresha, etc. Their Bhumij dialect is less and less spoken and Bengali is more widely spoken among the community.

History 
Bhumij means "one who is born from the soil". Herbert Hope Risley noted in 1890 that the Bhumij inhabit that tract of the country which lies on both sides of the Subarnarekha River. He claimed the eastern branch of Bhumij lost their connection with their original language and spoke Bengali. According to him, they were a group of Munda who moved east and lost connection with other Mundas, and later adopted Hindu customs when non-tribals arrived in the area.

While those living nearer to Chota Nagpur Plateau still retain linguistic links with Mundari, those living further east have adopted Bengali as their language. In Dhalbhum they are completely Hinduized. During British rule, or sometimes even earlier, many of the Bhumij became zamindars and some even secured the title of Raja. Others were called Sardar. However, all of them, having climbed the social ladder, proclaimed themselves to be Kshatriyas, in keeping with the trends in the region.

Rebellions
An account by Colonel Dalton claimed they were known as robbers, and their various rebellions were called . The people in the surrounding areas were quite scared of them. The well known Chuar revolt, a series of peasant rebellions started between 1766 and 1816 by the inhabitants of the countryside surrounding the West Bengali settlements of Midnapore, Bankura and Manbhum against the rule of the East India Company (EIC). The rebels rose in revolt due to the exploitative land revenue policies of the EIC, which threatened their economic livelihoods. According to L.S.S. O’Malley, an EIC administrator who wrote the Bengal District Gazetteer, "In March 1766 Government resolved to send an expedition into the country west and north-west of Midnapore in order to coerce them into paying revenue, and to capture and demolish as many of their strongholds as possible." Amongst the many dispossessed Bhumij zamindars, those who lent support to the rebels included royalty such as Jagannath Singh of Dhalbhum, Durjan Singh of Raipur, Baidyanath Singh of Dhalbhum, Mangal Singh of Panchet, Dubraj Singh of Birbhum, Raghunath Singh of Dhalbhum, the Rani Shiromani of Karnagarh, Raja Madhu Singh of Manbhum, Subal Singh of Kuilapal, Shyam Ganjam Singh of Dhadka, Raja Mohan Singh of Juriah, Lakshman Singh of Dulma, Sunder Narayan Singh and Fateh Singh. In 1798, when the Puncheet estate was sold to pay taxes required of it by the East India Company, the Bhumij led a revolt against the British.

The Bhumij revolt of 1832 is quite well-known. In this case, there was a disputed succession over the crown. The court decided the eldest son of the king, the son of the second wife instead of the son of the first wife (patrani), to be the king. Lakshman Narayan Singh, the son of the patrani, opposed his brother, was arrested and died in jail. A younger son of the patrani, Madabh Singh, was appointed diwan but became widely detested as a cheat who abused his position. Therefore, Ganga Narayan Singh (Lakshman's son) attacked Madabh Singh and killed him, and afterwards led a general uprising. The Britishers were forced to send in troops to quell the revolt, and pushed him into the hills. Ganga Narayan fled to Singhbum, where he was asked by the Lakras to prove his loyalty if they would join his cause. Their condition was for him to attack a fort of Kharsawan ruled by a Thakur that claimed supremacy over the area. During the siege, Ganga Narayan was killed, and his head was set to the Britishers by the Thakur.

Culture
The Bhumijs of Manbhum claim that their original occupation was military service. Subsequently, agriculture was taken as the sole activity by all the tribes, except the iron-smelting Shelo. A few were engaged in petty trade, and some immigrated to the tea districts of Assam. In Jharkhand and Bihar, the Bhumij even today depend upon agriculture, fishing, hunting and forest produces. Thus, the Bhumijs who are mainly agriculturists also hunt and trap birds and animals in the jungles, and the landless among them work as labourers. Various seasonally available forest products are a subsidiary source of income for them. Marginal income from wage labour, minor non-forest products and animal husbandry are the main source of livelihood for the rural Bhumij.

Rice is their staple food and is consumed throughout the year. They are non-vegetarians, but do not eat pork or beef. The Bhumijs also eat white-ants (termites) and insects. Drinks like rice beer and toddy are commonly consumed by them. Mahua liquor is used sumptuously during feasts and festivals.

As regards dress and ornaments, they follow their Hindu neighbours. Children of both the sexes go naked till the age of four or five years and after which they wear a towel or trouser till adolescence. The male dress consists of a shirt, a dhoti or lungi, and a towel. The women wear sari and blouse. Young girls are fond of ornaments such as nose-rings, earrings, bead necklaces, armlets and bangles made of brass. They put on flowers in their hair.

In the early 1900s, no Bhumij followed child marriage unless they were from the more Sanskritized wealthy families. Brides would be given for an amount ranging from Rs 3 to Rs 12 (in the early 20th century). Usually the wedding would be at the bride's house, where a square space, called a marwa, would be created in a courtyard by dabbing it with rice-water. In the center mahua and sidha branches would be placed, bound with cowries and 5 pieces of turmeric. At the ends of the square were placed 4 earthen water-vessels, each half-filled with pulses and covered with a lamp. The pots were connected with a cotton thread marking the boundary of the marwa. On the bridegroom's arrival, he would be led to the marwa and sit on a board called a pira. The bride would then sit on his left-hand side, and a short introduction would be delivered by relatives. A priest, would chant mantras, then the bride would light and blow out the lamps at the corners of the marwa 5 or 7 times, depending on the custom. The bride would then be "given" to the groom, and the priest would then join the couple's right hands. Finally, the groom applied kumkum to the bride's forehead and tied a knot that would remain intact for 3–10 days, after which they would rub themselves with turmeric, bathe, and untie the knot.

Sex before marriage was not considered taboo, but it was understood that if the girl became pregnant she would marry the father of the child. The Bhumij recognise polygyny, barrenness of first wife is the main reason. Polyandry is unknown. Widows are allowed to remarry according to the sanga ritual in which all the ceremonies of a regular marriage are not performed. Remarriage often takes place between widowers and widows, though bachelors are not barred from such a union. However, in case of woman, levirate applies mainly to widows. In case of widow-marriage also, bride-price of lesser amount is given. Divorce is also allowed among the Bhumijs in extreme cases of adultery, and the divorced women may remarry according to the sanga rite. However, a woman has no right to divorce her husband, and if she is neglected or ill-treated, only remedy available to her is to run away with another man. Adultery within the community is generally condoned with a fine but adultery with a member of another tribe results in ostracization.

At birth, a woman is attended by a midwife of the Ghasi community, and the umbilical cord is severed by her, and after birth it is put in a hole dug outside the hut. Birth-related pollution varies from 8 to 10 days, during which mother remains in the lying-in-room. After it, a Hindu washerman and barber are engaged to clean the clothes and shave and pare the nails. This is followed by naming ceremony.

After death, the rich section of the Bhumijs generally cremates the bodies of adults, and the poor ones bury them due to cost of firewood. However, the children of both rich and poor are buried. The practice of burial or cremation and observance of death pollution vary a little from place to place. But mourning takes place generally for ten days after which the cleaning and shaving rituals are performed, followed by certain rituals and feast marks the last part of death rituals. At times even the charred bones are kept in an earthen pot and carried to the ancestral clan ossuary for burial.

They also practice the martial art called Firkal, although it has been reduced to a single village among the Bhumij who perform it.

Language 

Bhumij is the language of the Munda subfamily of the Austroasiatic languages, related to Ho, Mundari and Santali, spoken mainly in the Indian states Jharkhand, Odisha and West Bengal. It is spoken by around 100,000 people in India.

In January 2019, Bhumij was accorded the status of second language in the state of Jharkhand.

Religion and festivals 
The Bhumijs revere the sun under the name of Sing Bonga and Dharam, both considered to be their supreme deities. They worship Jahuburu in the sacred grove of the village at the Sarhul festival in Baisakh (April–May) and Phalgun (February–March). Karakata, a female deity, responsible for rains and bumper crops, Baghut or Bagh-Bhut, a male deity, responsible to ward off the animals and protect the crops in Kartik (October–November), Gram-Deota and Deoshali, the village deities to ward off sickness and watch over supply of water for drinking and irrigation in Ashadh (July–August), Buru, a mountain deity, for general prosperity in Magh, Panchbahini and Baradela, local deities of Bankura Bhumijs, etc., are worshipped by the Bhumijs. Manasa, a deity, presiding over snakes, is worshipped in Shravana (July–August) for two or three days in the courtyards of Seraikela Bhumijs. The Bhumijs also worship Paori, a female deity, in Jaistha (May–June) and again in Asadh (June–July) for timely rains and general welfare of the village. Asadhi puja is performed before ploughing and transplanting of paddy seedlings. They worship Jaharburi in Chaitra (March–April), associated with the better flowering of the sal tree and also better shooting out of sal leaves. Atra, a Goddess, for protection from smallpox is worshipped. Dhulla Puja is held in Baisakh (April–May) for the wellbeing of the village. Vadhna Parab is held on the day of the new moon in Kartik (October–November) before reaping, and Nua-Khia, the new rice-eating ceremony. The Bhumijs also celebrate Karam festival in Bhadra (August – September) for prosperity of the village. An unmarried male goes to the jungle and brings a branch of the Karam tree and plants near the house of the Dehuri or at any particular place meant for it. After a long spell of dance and music throughout the night, they immerse it in water on the next day.

The community priest, variously known as Laya, Naya or Dehuri, is from their own tribe rather than a Brahmin, and he solely conducts all the rituals and ceremonies for all deities. As the Naya is a communal servant of the village, all its inhabitants have equal claims on his services. For his services he receives a few plots of rent-free land and the heads of sacrificed animals in the communal religious rites. For this, in addition to performance of religious rituals, he makes certain sacrifices like avoiding certain food and observing fast on certain occasions. The office of Naya is generally hereditary. The whole community gets involved in any social or religious celebration. People dance to the tune of a madal (drum) and sing religious and romantic songs depending on the occasion. Community feast and intoxicating drinks provide the Bhumijs the desired amusement. The institutions of soya and phul among the Bhumijs of Manbhum help in establishing ceremonial friendship with people of other communities. Thus, the Bhumijs have a good sense of community feeling and they maintain equilibrium and peaceful coexistence. However, by the turn of the 20th century, Hinduism had begun to change many of their local customs.

The followers of Sarnaism among the Bhumij have been organising protests and petitions to have their religion recognised by the government of India in census forms.

Genetics
According to genetic study conducted on Bhumij population on 2010, it was found that their 70% Y Haplogroups belongs to O2a-M95 found among population of Southeast Asia and Austro-Asiatic language speaker and rest belongs to Haplogroups found in India. Their mitrocondrial Haplogroups belongs Haplogroup M (mtDNA) found in Indian subcontinent.

Notable Bhumijs 

 Durga Bhumij - politician
 Haren Bhumij - politician
 Jogeswar Bhumij - cricketer
 Pranjal Bhumij - footballer
 Gambhir Singh Mura - Padma Shri recipient and tribal Chhau dancer
 Amulya Sardar - politician
 Hari Ram Sardar - politician
 Maneka Sardar - politician
 Sanatan Sardar - tribal leader and politician
 Sanjib Sardar - politician
 Rani Shiromani - queen of Karnagarh and leader of Chuar rebellion
 Baidyanath Singh - leader of Chuar rebellion
 Dubraj Singh - leader of Chuar rebellion
 Durjan Singh - leader of Chuar rebellion
 Ganga Narayan Singh - leader of Bhumij rebellion and Chuar rebellion
 Jagannath Singh - leader of Chuar rebellion
 Raghunath Singh - leader of Chuar rebellion
 Shyam Ganjam Singh - leader of Chuar rebellion
 Subal Singh - leader of Chuar rebellion

See Also
Bhumij language
Ganga Narayan Singh
Bhumij rebellion
Chuar rebellion
Ol Onal

References

Bibliography
  Alt URL

Further reading

External links

 
Social groups of Assam
Scheduled Tribes of India
Tribes of West Bengal
Social groups of Odisha
Tribes of Jharkhand
Ethnic groups in Bangladesh
Social groups of West Bengal
Social groups of Jharkhand
Scheduled Tribes of Jharkhand